The Kildonan Gold Rush was a gold rush in the Strath of Kildonan, Sutherland, in the Highlands of Scotland in 1869. Small amounts of gold had long been discovered in the Kildonan area. A nugget with enough material for a ring was discovered in 1818. Public interest was sparked, and a gold rush started, following a newspaper announcement in 1868 of the results of Robert Nelson Gilchrist more systematic search for gold. The gold rush proper began in January 1869. At this stage those searching for gold stayed in Helmsdale or more ad hoc accommodation near the Kildonan burn including the old Kildonan Church.

Two small towns, Baile an Or ( "town of gold") and Carn na Buth ( "hill of huts") were built to accommodate the prospectors. However, the gold rush ended by 1870, as the Duke of Sutherland ended it due to conflict of interest with deer stalkers.

References

External links
 

Gold rushes
1860s in Scotland
1860s in the United Kingdom
1869 in Scotland
1869 in the United Kingdom
Sutherland
Economic history of Scotland
Gold mining in the United Kingdom
Mining in Scotland